is Toei Company's thirty-first entry in the Super Sentai metaseries. Production began on September 29, 2006 with principal photography beginning on October 6, 2006. It aired on TV Asahi's 2007 Super Hero Time programming block with Kamen Rider Den-O from February 18, 2007 to February 10, 2008, replacing Gogo Sentai Boukenger and was replaced by Engine Sentai Go-onger.

Its footage was used for the American television series, Power Rangers Jungle Fury. Gekiranger was dubbed into Korean as Power Rangers Wild Spirit for South Korean television.

Story

Four thousand years ago in Ancient China, a form of Chinese styled-like kenpō martial arts called  was developed. It was created by a man named Brusa Ee, who came to Japan and built the hidden village . Jūken is a martial art in which one mimics the abilities of animals as well as trying to attain spiritual peace. However, dissent grew among the creator's ten students. Three of them believed that they should use the suffering and hatred harnessed within humans to increase their power, using their power to assume their monstrous forms; the Three Kenma. After Brusa Ee was murdered, the Kenma gathered followers to practice an evil form of the Jūken style known as Rin Jūken Akugata. The other seven students believed that true strength should come from within and engaged their former friends in a great war, ending the fight with a forbidden technique to seal the Kenma powers at the cost of losing their human forms in the process, becoming the Seven Kensei. Followers of the Kensei created the Geki Jūken Beast Arts school: the Jūken of justice whose sport discipline enhances the human body with the self-produced positive Qi called "Geki." It is taught by Grand Master Xia Fu, one of the Seven Kensei, using a sports goods company named "SCRTC" as a front. Presently, a fallen student from the Geki Jūken school named Rio turned to the Rin Jūken style. He rebuilds the Rinjū Hall and brings the long-dead Rin Jūken users back to life as kyonshi to collect Rinki, Geki's polar opposite Qi, to resurrect the Three Kenma so that through them, he can become stronger. To fight the new Rinjū Hall, Xia Fu trained two youths: Ran Uzaki and Retsu Fukami. Along with Jyan Kandou, a feral boy raised by tigers in the woods near Jūgenkyō, the Gekiranger team is formed and later joined by two other Geki Jūken users, Gou Fukami, Retsu's brother and master of the Geki Jū Wolf-Ken style, and Ken Hisatsu, a genius master of the Geki Jū Rhinoceros-Ken style, to save the world from the Akugata's ambitions. However, an even greater evil uses the two sides for its plan.

Production
The trademark for the series was filed by Toei Company on September 19, 2006.

In a final message to the fans, producer  cites various items he thanks for inspiring the series, including the past Sentai series and the essayist  for teaching them about manga that they reference in the series. They also thank Sammo Hung, Jet Li, Jackie Chan, Donnie Yen, Michelle Yeoh, and Yuen Biao for allowing them to use their names.

Episodes

At the end of each , from the first 38 episodes and resuming at the 46-48th episodes, there is a short Beast Arts Academy segment that explains the many pieces of the Gekiranger arsenal, such as the capabilities of the Geki Changer or the performing of Geki Waza.

Special DVD
 is a special DVD given out with the December issue of Terebi Magazine. After their latest win, the three Gekirangers find the Kensei stretching for their annual Kensei Great Athletic Meet. Jyan, wanting to win the gold medal and a year's supply of Terebi magazines, joins the Red Team (Sharkie, Bat, Elehung) to go against the White Team (Xia Fu and the Master Triangle). With Retu as judge and Ran as moderator, the contest starts with the dunking match, as clips of the training results of Bat Li, Elephung, and Sharkie are shown, ending with the white Team winning by default. In the second match, a horseriding match, the White Team had the advantage due to the Master Triangle's teamwork, with clips of their training results shown. But due to the banana Gorie dropped prior to the match starting, the Red Team wins. In the tie breaker, a one-on-one Sumo match between Gorie and Sharkie. But neither refuse to lose, using the Double-Double Clone Fist to take their fight outside SCRTC. Sharkie's attacks have no effect until he managed to use Gorie's strength to make the win for the red team. Despite the White Team's losing, Xia Fu steals the magazines, with the red team and the Gekirangers in pursuit. After Xia Fu is disciplined, seeing he needs more training himself, the DVD ends with a clipshow of the series from Lessons 1 to 35.

Films

Nei-Nei! Hou-Hou! Hong Kong Decisive Battle

 aired alongside the Kamen Rider Den-O movie Kamen Rider Den-O: I'm Born! starting August 4, 2007. The events of the movie take place between Lessons 9 and 10.

Gekiranger vs. Boukenger

In , the Gekiranger team meets up with the team from GoGo Sentai Boukenger. The DVD was released on March 14, 2008, for rental and March 21, 2008, for purchase. This is the first team-up to be in wide-screen, appropriate as Boukenger and Gekiranger were the first Sentai series to be themselves shown in wide-screen. The events of the movie take place between Lessons 35 and 36.

Go-onger vs. Gekiranger

Initially scheduled for DVD release on March 21, 2009,  features the return of Hiroki Suzuki, Mina Fukui, Manpei Takagi, Riki Miura, Sotaro, Hirofumi Araki, Yuka Hirata, Naoki Kawano, and Kazue Itoh reprising their roles as Jyan Kandou, Ran Uzaki, Retu Fukami, Gou Fukami, Ken Hisatsu, Rio, Mere, Long, and Miki Masaki from Juken Sentai Gekiranger. To defeat their common foes, the Go-ongers, the Go-on Wings, and the Gekirangers team up with the revived Rio and Mere to fight the new evil team and stop them from releasing Long.

On December 6, 2008, several of the cast members of Go-onger announced on their blogs that there is going to be a second Go-onger movie. The next day, Toei announced on its Go-onger website that the film was going to be Go-onger vs. Gekiranger, and that it was to commemorate the 15th of the Super Sentai V-Cinema VS Series, having started initially with J.A.K.Q. Dengekitai vs. Gorenger in 1978 and revived annually with Chouriki Sentai Ohranger vs. Kakuranger in 1996. The film was released to theaters on January 24, 2009.

Kyuranger vs. Space Squad

 is a V-Cinema release that features a crossover between Uchu Sentai Kyuranger and Space Squad. Aside from the main cast of Kyuranger, Yuma Ishigaki and Hiroaki Iwanaga (Space Sheriff Gavan: The Movie), Yuka Hirata (Juken Sentai Gekiranger), Mitsuru Karahashi (Samurai Sentai Shinkenger), Kei Hosogai (Kaizoku Sentai Gokaiger) and Ayame Misaki (Tokumei Sentai Go-Busters) return to reprise their respective roles. The V-Cinema will be released on DVD and Blu-ray on August 8, 2018.

Cast
 : , 
 : 
 : 
 : 
 : 
 : 
 Rio (Young; 1, 12, 46 & 47), Jyan's Hong Kong Student (49): 
 : 
 : 
 : 
 : 
 : 
 : 
 :

Voice actors
 : 
 : 
 : 
 : 
 : 
 : 
 : 
 : 
 : 
 : 
 : 
 : 
 Narration:

Mecha

GekiBeasts
 GekiTiger
 GekiCheetah
 GekiJaguar

RinBeasts
 RinLion
 RinChameleon

Songs
Opening theme
 
 Lyrics: Neko Oikawa
 Composition: Takafumi Iwasaki
 Arrangement: Seiichi Kyōda
 Artist: Takayoshi Tanimoto with Young Fresh on chorus

Ending theme
 
 Lyrics: Shoko Fujibayashi
 Composition: 
 Arrangement: 
 Artist: Ichirou Mizuki with Young Fresh (Chorus)

Character songs Beginning with Lesson 39 and ending with Lesson 45, the Character Songs replaced the Jūken Academy segments and "Tao" as the ending theme. The Juken Sentai Gekiranger Character Song Album was released on December 19, 2007, and includes the following songs and karaoke versions of each song.
  performed by  
 "Run" performed by 
 "Just make it out!" performed by 
 "Wandering Wolf" performed by 
  performed by 
  performed by 
  performed by

Notes

International Broadcasts and Home Video
The series was limited to only airing in Asian regions outside of Japan, as most international regions have aired the Power Rangers adaptation, Power Rangers Jungle Fury instead.
In South Korea, the series was dubbed in Korean and aired in 2008 under Power Rangers Wild Spirits (파워레인저 와일드스피릿) and aired on several TV channels. (Champ TV, Anione, Anibox and Cartoon Network)
In the Chinese-speaking world, Both Mandarin (Taiwan dialect) and Cantonese dubs were produced and aired in Taiwan and Hong Kong respectively.
In Taiwan, the series aired with a Taiwanese Mandarin dub on November 1, 2009 until October 3, 2010 with all episodes dubbed, airing on GTV.
In Hong Kong, the series aired with a Cantonese Chinese dub on March 14, 2010 (a few months after Taiwan aired the Taiwanese Mandarin dub) on TVB Jade until March 6, 2011 with all episodes dubbed.
In Thailand, the series was given a Thai dub and Rose Media Entertainment holds the rights to the TV license. It aired on Channel 5 and also on the Cartoon Gang Program starting on October 17, 2009 until September 18, 2010 with all episodes dubbed and showcased. It was also released on home video by them.
The series was released in Vietnam with a Vietnamese dub by Phuong Nam Film Studio under Geki Ranger - Siêu Nhân Mãnh Thú on VCD and DVD.

References

External links
 
 
  at Super-Sentai.net
  at Nippon Columbia

Super Sentai
Martial arts television series
2007 Japanese television series debuts
2008 Japanese television series endings
Japanese action television series
Japanese fantasy television series
Japanese science fiction television series
Muay Thai television series